Orlik may refer to:

People
Anna Orlik (born 1993), Belarusian tennis player
Curdin Orlik (born 1993), Swiss wrestler
Edmund Roman Orlik (1918-1982), an early Polish tank ace
Peter Orlik (born 1938), American mathematician
Kazimierz Orlik-Łukoski (1890-1940), a military commander
Wilhelm Orlik-Rueckemann (1894-1986), a military commander
Marian Bernaciak (1917-1946), Polish partisan leader whose nom de guerre was Orlik ("Little Eagle")

Places
Orlik, Pomeranian Voivodeship, north Poland
Orlik, Warmian-Masurian Voivodeship, north Poland
Orlik, Atyrau Region, Kazakhstan
Orlik, Russia, several rural localities in Russia
Òrlik - Orlik, Pomeranian Voivodeship

In aviation
PZL-130 Orlik, a Polish turboprop trainer aircraft
Orlik Aerobatic Team, a Polish aerobatic team flying the PZL-130 Orlik
Orlican VT-16 Orlik, Czechoslovakian glider of 1959 
Warsztaty Szybowcowe Orlik, glider of 1938

Other
Orlík (Czech oi! punk band)
Orlik (armoured train)

See also
 Orlík (disambiguation) (Czech form)
 Orlyk (Ukrainian transliteration)

Polish-language surnames